The Colony of British Columbia was a British Crown Colony that resulted from the amalgamation of the two former colonies, the Colony of Vancouver Island and the mainland Colony of British Columbia. The two former colonies were united in 1866, and the united colony existed until its incorporation into the Canadian Confederation in 1871.

Background 

The Colony of Vancouver Island had been created in 1849 to bolster British claims to the whole island and the adjacent Gulf Islands, and to provide a North Pacific home port for the Royal Navy at Esquimalt.  By the mid-1850s, the Island Colony's non-indigenous population was around 800 people; a mix of mostly British, French-Canadian, Hawaiians, but with handfuls of Iroquoians, Métis and Cree in the employ of the fur company, and a few Belgian and French Oblate priests (thousands of First Nations died due to the smallpox epidemic, which had occurred in the 16th century). Three years earlier, the Treaty of Washington had established the boundary between British North America and the United States of America west of the Rocky Mountains along the 49th parallel. The mainland area of present-day British Columbia, Canada was an unorganised territory under British sovereignty until 1858. The region was under the de facto administration of the Hudson's Bay Company, and its regional chief executive, James Douglas, who also happened to be Governor of Vancouver Island. The region was informally given the name New Caledonia, after the fur-trading district which covered the central and northern interior of the mainland west of the Rockies.

All this changed with the Fraser Canyon Gold Rush of 1857–1858, when the non-aboriginal population of the mainland swelled from about 150 Hudson's Bay Company employees and their families to about 20,000 prospectors, speculators, land agents, and merchants. The British Colonial Office acted swiftly, proclaiming the Crown Colony of British Columbia (1858–1866) on 2 August 1858, and dispatching Richard Clement Moody and the Royal Engineers, Columbia Detachment to establish British order and to transform the newly established Colony into the British Empire's "bulwark in the farthest west" and "found a second England on the shores of the Pacific". Moody was appointed Chief Commissioner of Lands and Works and Lieutenant-Governor of British Columbia.

United colonies 

Moody and the Columbia Detachment disbanded in July 1863, and Moody returned to England. Douglas continued to administer the mainland colony  from Victoria, but Sir Arthur Kennedy was appointed to succeed him as Governor of Vancouver Island. New Westminster would welcome its first resident governor, Frederick Seymour, in 1864. Both colonies were labouring under huge debts, largely accumulated by the completion of extensive infrastructure to service the huge population influx. As gold revenues dropped, the loans secured to pay for these projects undermined the economies of the colonies, and pressure grew in London for their amalgamation. Despite a great deal of ambivalence in some quarters, on 6 August 1866, the united colony was proclaimed, with the capital and assembly in Victoria, and Seymour was designated governor.

Seymour continued as governor of the united colonies until 1869, but after the British North America Act joined three colonies (New Brunswick, Nova Scotia, and the Province of Canada) into the Canadian Confederation in 1867, it seemed increasingly only a matter of time before Vancouver Island and British Columbia would negotiate terms of union. Major players in the Confederation League such as Amor De Cosmos, Robert Beaven, and John Robson pushed for union primarily as a way of advancing both the economic health of the region, as well as increased democratic reform through truly representative and responsible government. In this effort, they were supported and aided by Canadian officials, especially Sir Samuel Tilley, a Father of Confederation and Minister of Customs in the government of Prime Minister Sir John A. Macdonald. Seymour, ill and beset by protests that he was dragging in his feet in completing negotiations for the HBC's territory, was facing the end of his term, and Macdonald was pressing London to replace him with Sir Anthony Musgrave, outgoing governor of the Colony of Newfoundland. Before the appointment could be finalized, however, Seymour died.

With Musgrave's appointment, the British colonial secretary, Lord Granville, pushed Musgrave to accelerate negotiations with Canada towards union. It took almost two years for those negotiations, in which Canada eventually agreed to shoulder the colonies' massive debt and join the territory to a transcontinental railway, to be finalized. His efforts led to the admission of British Columbia as the sixth province of Canada on 20 July 1871.

Governors of the united Colony of British Columbia 
Frederick Seymour, 1866–1869
Sir Anthony Musgrave, 1869–1871

Legislative Council of the united Colony of British Columbia 
1866 to 1869 14 members were appointed by the governor and 9 were elected by the public.
1869 to 1872 13 members appointed by the Governor, 8 elected by the public.

Elections to the Legislative Council of the united Colony of British Columbia 
1866 Colony of British Columbia general election
1869 Colony of British Columbia general election

Supreme Court 
In 1869 Supreme Courts were established on the mainland ("The Supreme Court of the Mainland of British Columbia") and on Vancouver Island ("Supreme Court of Vancouver Island"), which merged in 1870 as the Supreme Court of British Columbia.

In 1858 the British Government had sent over Matthew Baillie Begbie as Chief Justice for the colony. Although trained at Lincoln's Inn he had never practised law, but soon published a Rules of Court and a timetable of sittings. He held the post, under consecutive administrative regimes, until his death in 1894.

See also 

Former colonies and territories in Canada
Territorial evolution of Canada after 1867
Alaska boundary dispute

Reference List

External links 
Order in Council determining British Columbia's terms of union with the Dominion of Canada, 1871
 
 

British North America
Colony of British Columbia (1866-1871)
Colony of British Columbia (1866-1871)
Former British colonies and protectorates in the Americas
States and territories established in 1866
1871 disestablishments in North America
1866 establishments in the British Empire
Former colonies in North America
1866 establishments in North America
1870s disestablishments in the British Empire